The Georgia Southwestern State Hurricanes (also Georgia Southwestern or GSW) are the athletic teams that represent the Georgia Southwestern State University, located in Americus, Georgia, in intercollegiate sports at the Division II level of the National Collegiate Athletic Association (NCAA), primarily competing in the Peach Belt Conference since the 2006–07 academic year.

Georgia Southwestern competes in ten intercollegiate varsity sports. Men's sports include baseball, basketball, cross country, golf, and soccer; while women's sports include basketball, cross country, soccer, softball, and tennis.

Conference affiliations 
NAIA
Southern States Athletic Conference (1999–2006)

NCAA
 Peach Belt Conference (2006–present)

Varsity teams 
In addition to its varsity programs, Georgia Southwestern State also sponsors a club e-sports team.

Former sports 
Football was played at the university between 1983 and 1989. The men's tennis program was discontinued in 2019, while men's cross country was added.

Notable alumni

Men's basketball 
 Adam Thoseby

Men's golf 
 Vincent Norrman

References

External links